George Marvin Wallhauser (February 10, 1900 – August 4, 1993) was an American Republican Party politician. He served as U.S. Representative from New Jersey's 12th Congressional District from 1959 to 1965.

Biography
Wallhauser was born in Newark, New Jersey, the son of Dr. Henry Joseph Frederick and Rachel Apolonia (née Vogt) Wallhauser. He attended public schools in Newark and graduated from Barringer High School in 1918. He entered the United States Navy the same year and served as a hospital corpsman in the Naval Reserve until 1922. He graduated from the University of Pennsylvania with an A.B. in 1922, where he had been a member of Phi Sigma Kappa fraternity. He later studied real estate appraisal at Columbia University.

Wallhauser was associated with the United States Realty and Investment Company, Newark, New Jersey, for 62 years, joining the company in 1927 and retiring as senior vice president and member of the board in 1989.

He was elected as a Republican to the 86th Congress in 1958, succeeding Rep. Robert W. Kean, and took office the following year.  He was reelected twice, in 1960 and 1962, against Democrat Robert R. Peacock. He served as a member of the 87th and 88th Congresses until 1965 when he did not seek reelection.  A member of the House Committee on Post Office and Civil Service, he championed federal pay raises and improvements for postal workers.  Wallhauser represented the 12th New Jersey District, which at the time included the South Ward of Newark, Irvington, Maplewood, Millburn, Livingston and municipalities in West Essex County.

In 1970, Wallhauser was appointed by New Jersey Governor William T. Cahill as a commissioner of the New Jersey Highway Authority (Garden State Parkway) and served as its chairman from 1972 to 1975. Earlier, he was chairman in 1946-47 of the Maplewood Planning Board, which issued the township's first master plan, and member of the Maplewood Township Committee 1954–56.  In this latter post he chaired the building committee for the construction of two libraries in town and chaired the Murals Committee. In Maplewood, he also was active in junior baseball as a manager and coach and chaired the town's junior football committee.

Wallhauser's other activities included chairman and trustee of the Paper Mill Playhouse, Millburn, New Jersey; member and treasurer of the National Board of Directors, Family Service Association of America; president, Bureau of Family Service of the Oranges and Maplewood; vice president and trustee, St. Barnabas Medical Center, Livingston, N.J.; director of the Maplewood Bank and Trust Company, Yorkwood Savings and Loan Association and of Goodwill Industries of New Jersey; and member of the American Legion. 
He was a Freemason, serving as a past master of St. John's Lodge No. 1, of the Grand Lodge of New York, F.& A.M.

Wallhauser lived in Maplewood for 63 years until his death on August 4, 1993 in Livingston, New Jersey.  He also maintained a summer home at Greenwood Lake, New York.

Wallhauser was Isabel Towne in 1926, and she died in 1981. He had two children, George Jr., and Henry as well as five grandchildren.  George M. Wallhauser Jr. served as the Essex County Republican Chairman and was the Republican candidate for Congress in New Jersey's 11th district in 1968 against U.S. Rep. Joseph Minish.

References

External links 
 

1900 births
1993 deaths
Barringer High School alumni
People from Maplewood, New Jersey
Politicians from Newark, New Jersey
Republican Party members of the United States House of Representatives from New Jersey
20th-century American politicians
United States Navy corpsmen
United States Navy reservists